Thomas Barr (born 23 April 1942) is a Scottish retired amateur football right back who made over 230 appearances in the Scottish League for Queen's Park. He represented Scotland at amateur level.

References

Scottish footballers
Scottish Football League players
Queen's Park F.C. players
Association football fullbacks
Living people
People from Carluke
1942 births
Scotland amateur international footballers
Lanark United F.C. players